Lupinus hirsutissimus is a species of lupine known by the common names stinging annual lupine or stinging lupine. It is native to the coastal mountains of Baja California and Southern California as far north as the San Francisco Bay Area. It grows on dry mountain slopes, including areas that have recently burned, and chaparral and woodlands habitats.

Description
Lupinus hirsutissimus is an erect annual herb growing  to one meter tall; it may exceed one meter in habitat recovering from wildfire. The stem and herbage are coated in long, stiff hairs that sting skin when touched. The inflorescence bears several flowers generally not arranged in whorls. Each flower is between 1 and 2 centimeters long and dark pink in color with a yellowish to pinkish spot on its banner.

See also
California chaparral and woodlands 
California coastal sage and chaparral ecoregion  	
California montane chaparral and woodlands

References

External links
Jepson Manual Treatment - Lupinus hirsutissimus
Lupinus hirsutissimus - Photo gallery

hirsutissimus
Flora of California
Flora of Baja California
Natural history of the California chaparral and woodlands
Natural history of the California Coast Ranges
Natural history of the Peninsular Ranges
Natural history of the Santa Monica Mountains
Natural history of the Transverse Ranges
Flora without expected TNC conservation status